Diethelm von Eichel-Streiber (10 August 1914 – 13 May 1996) was a German Luftwaffe officer in the Spanish Civil War and World War II. During the Spanish Civil War, he flew with Kampfgruppe 88 of the Condor Legion as an air observer. During World War II, he became a fighter ace credited with 96 aerial victories. With the exception of two aerial victories claimed over the Western Allies, the majority of his aerial victories were achieved on the Eastern Front.

Early life and career

Eichel-Streiber was born on 10 August 1914 in Oppershausen, at the time in the Province of Saxony within the German Empire, present-day in Thuringia.

In November 1937, he joined the Condor Legion and was posted to Kampfgruppe 88 as an air observer on a Heinkel He 111. On 14 April 1939, he was awarded the Spanish Cross in Gold with Swords, for his service in the Spanish Civil War.

World War II
In November 1940, Eichel-Streiber was posted to III. Gruppe of Jagdgeschwader 77 (JG 77th—77th Fighter Wing) where he served as an adjutant to his commanding officer and uncle Major Alexander von Winterfeldt. JG 77 had just been ordered to relocate from Norway to airfields near the English Channel. The Gruppenstab (headquarters unit) of III. Gruppe arrived in Dinan in northwestern France on 11 December. In preparation for Operation Marita, the Geschwaderstab, II. and III. Gruppe of JG 77 transferred to Deta in western Romania on 1 April 1941, completing the relocation by 4 April. German forces invaded Greece and Yugoslavia on 6 April. That day, III. Gruppe flew fighter escort missions for Junkers Ju 87 dive bombers from Sturzkampfgeschwader 77 (StG 77—77th Dive Bomber Wing) attacking Belgrade. The next day, the Gruppe was ordered to an airfield named Sofia-Vrba located approximately halfway between Radomir and Sofia to augment the [[8th Air Corps (Germany)|VIII. Fliegerkorps]] (8th Air Corps) commanded by Generaloberst Wolfram Freiherr von Richthofen. The Gruppe then followed the German advance to Skopje on 10 April. On 14 April, III. Gruppe moved to Prilep and then to Axioupoli followed by another relocation to Korinos on 16 April. On 19 April, operating from Korinos, III. Gruppe flew close air support missions. During an attack on the Dadion airfield at Amfikleia, Eichel-Streiber strafed and destroyed two Gloster Gladiator biplane fighters. The Gruppe then moved to Larissa on 20 April,  from Larissa to Almyros on 22 April, and from Almyros to Tanagra on 27 April.  The fighting in Greece ceased on 30 April and JG 77 was given a period of rest.

In preparation for the Battle of Crete, III. Gruppe was ordered to Molaoi on 11 May. The Gruppe flew its first combat missions to Crete on 14 May, attacking the airfield at Maleme. During this early morning attack, Eichel-Streiber claimed his first aerial victory when he shot down a Hawker Hurricane fighter. Later that day, the Gruppe flew a second mission to Crete. During this mission, Eichel-Streiber's Messerschmitt Bf 109 E-7 (Werknummer 6435—factory number) was hit by anti-aircraft artillery, tearing off his left horizontal stabiliser and damaging his vertical stabilizer, resulting in a forced landing at Maloi.

Operation Barbarossa and squadron leader
In preparation for Operation Barbarossa, the German invasion of the Soviet Union, III. Gruppe was moved to Bucharest and was located in the sector of Heeresgruppe Süd (Army Group South). III. Gruppe arrived in Bucharest on 16 June. Four days later, III. Gruppe moved to Roman. That evening, the pilots and ground crews were briefed of the upcoming invasion of the Soviet Union, which opened the Eastern Front on 22 June. On 26 June, III. Gruppe flew seven combat missions. On the fifth mission of the day, a fighter escort mission for He 111 bombers from Kampfgeschwader 27 (KG 27—27th Bomber Wing), the flight encountered 25 Soviet Tupolev SB and 10 Ilyushin DB-3 bombers. During this engagement, Eichel-Streiber claimed four bombers shot down, taking his total to five aerial victories.

On 29 December 1941, Eichel-Streiber was appointed Staffelkapitän (squadron leader) of 1. Staffel of the Ergänzungsgruppe of Jagdgeschwader 2 "Richthofen" (JG 2—2nd Fighter Wing), a supplementary training group. At the time, the Staffel was based in Döberitz before moving to Bergen aan Zee on 7 January 1942. In January 1942, the Staffel became part of the newly formed IV. Gruppe of Jagdgeschwader 1 (JG 1—1st Fighter Wing) where it thus became 10. Staffel of JG 1. IV. Gruppe first major task was Operation Donnerkeil, an air superiority operation to support the Kriegsmarine (German Navy) Operation Cerberus. End-February to early March 1942, IV. Gruppe began relocating north to Trondheim. On 21 March, IV./JG 1 was renamed to III. Gruppe of Jagdgeschwader 5 (JG 5—5th Fighter Wing) and placed under the command of Hauptmann Günther Scholz. During this reassignment, Eichel-Streiber's Staffel became a newly formed 1. Staffel of JG 5 subordinated to I. Gruppe. On 4 May, Eichel-Streiber was posted to the Gruppenstab of II. Gruppe of Jagdgeschwader 26 "Schlageter" (JG 26—26th Fighter Wing). He was replaced by Oberleutnant Wolfgang Kosse who had been transferred from JG 26.

With Jagdgeschwader 51
In early October 1942, II. Gruppe of Jagdgeschwader 51 (JG 51—51st Fighter Wing) was withdrawn from the Eastern Front and sent to Jesau, near present-day Bagrationovsk, to Heiligenbeil, present-day Mamonovo, to be reequipped with the Focke Wulf Fw 190 A. While undergoing training on this aircraft, the Gruppe received orders on 4 November to transfer to the Mediterranean theatre flying the Bf 109 again. 6. Staffel was exempt from this order, was detached from II. Gruppe, and continued its training on the Fw 190. In late November, 6. Staffel was renamed to Stabsstaffel (headquarters squadron) of JG 51 and placed under the command of von Eichel-Streiber on 30 November.

The Stabsstaffel transferred to the Eastern Front again on 5 February 1943 where it was based at an airfield at Smolensk. On 4 March, the Stabsstaffel flew missions in support of elements of the 9th Army fighting east and northeast of Bely during the Battles of Rzhev. That day, the Stabsstaffel claimed seven aerial victories including an Ilyushin Il-2 ground-attack aircraft claimed shot down by Eichel-Streiber. The Stabsstaffel was tasked with providing fighter protection of the Smolensk airfield on 15 March. Shortly after sundown, Eichel-Streiber led a flight of Fw 190 fighters against six Il-2 ground-attack aircraft and their fighter escort. In the encounter east of Demidov, Eichel-Streiber claimed one of the attacking Il-2 aircraft shot down.

On the first day of the Battle of Kursk, 5 July 1943, the Stabsstaffel relocated from Smolensk to Oryol where it fought over the northern face of the salient.

On 11 September, Eichel-Streiber made a forced landing in his Fw 190 A-6 (Werknummer 530333) due to engine failure of the aircraft. Injured in the landing, he went on home-leave for a period of rest and convalescence. During his absence, he was replaced by Hauptmann Wolfram Philipps.

Group commander
Eichel-Streiber was appointed Gruppenkommandeur (group commander) of III. Gruppe of JG 51 on 1 April 1944. He succeeded Hauptmann Fritz Losigkeit in this capacity who was made Geschwaderkommodore (wing commander) of JG 51 the day before. Command of the Stabsstaffel was then temporarily passed to Leutnant Herbert Friebel before Hauptmann Edwin Thiel took command in May 1944. At the time. III. Gruppe was converting back from the Fw 190 to the Bf 109 at Dęblin–Irena. On 5 April, Eichel-Streiber was awarded the Knight's Cross of the Iron Cross.

On 24 April, elements of III. Gruppe began relocating to Terespol where the Geschwaderstab (headquarters unit) and I. Gruppe of JG 51 were based, fighting predominantly in the combat area of Kovel. The relocation was completed by 15 May. The Gruppe moved to Babruysk on 21 June and the following day, Soviet Forces launched Operation Bagration (22 June – 19 August) which nearly annihilated Army Group Centre. On 21 June, bombers of the Eighth Air Force on a shuttle bombing mission of Operation Frantic, attacked oil refineries south of Berlin before heading for the Poltava Air Base. The bombers were intercepted by elements of JG 51 led by Losigkeit. In this encounter, two of the escorting North American P-51 Mustang fighters were shot down. One of the P-51 fighters crashed near the Luftwaffe airfield at Babruysk where III. Gruppe was based. In its cockpit, a map of the Poltava Air Base was found. Eichel-Streiber sent the map to the headquarters of Luftflotte 6 (6th Air Fleet). This intelligence led to an attack by Luftwaffe bombers which destroyed 44 parked Boeing B-17 Flying Fortress bombers and damaged further 26.

On 24 June, the Soviet Air Forces fielded 4,500 combat missions over the combat area of Army Group Centre while Luftflotte 6 flew 111 ground attack and 150 fighter missions, creating a 1:15 discrepancy. That day, III. Gruppe flew several missions in the combat area south and southeast of Babruysk. During these missions, Eichel-Streiber claimed an Il-2 ground-attack aircraft on a morning mission south of Parichi and another Il-2 later in the afternoon east of Babruysk.

On 25 August 1944, Eichel-Streiber was transferred and appointed Gruppenkommandeur of I. Gruppe of Jagdgeschwader 27 (JG 27—27th Fighter Wing). Command of his former III. Gruppe of JG 51 was passed on to Hauptmann Joachim Brendel.

Summary of career
Aerial victory claims
According to US historian David T. Zabecki, von Eichel-Streiber was credited with 96 aerial victories. Spick also lists von Eichel-Streiber with 96 aerial victories claimed in an unknown number combat missions. This figure includes 94 aerial victories on the Eastern Front, and further two victories over the Western Allies. Mathews and Foreman, authors of Luftwaffe Aces — Biographies and Victory Claims, researched the German Federal Archives and found records for 91 aerial victory claims, plus three further unconfirmed claims. This figure includes 90 claims on the Eastern Front and one over the Western Allies.

Victory claims were logged to a map-reference (PQ = Planquadrat), for example "PQ 35 Ost 36121". These sectors were then subdivided into 36 smaller units to give a location area 3 × 4 km in size.

Awards
Spanish Cross in Gold with Swords (14 April 1939)
German Cross in Gold on 17 October 1943 as Hauptmann in the Stabsstaffel/Jagdgeschwader 51
Honour Goblet of the Luftwaffe on 13 September 1943 as Hauptmann and StaffelkapitänKnight's Cross of the Iron Cross on 5 April 1944 as Hauptmann and Staffelkapitän of the Stab/Jagdgeschwader'' 51 "Mölders"

Notes

References

Citations

Bibliography

 
 
 
 
 
 
 
 
 
 
 
 
 
 
 
 
 
 
 
 
 
 
 
 
 
 
 
 
 

1914 births
1996 deaths
Condor Legion personnel
German World War II flying aces
Military personnel from Thuringia
People from the Province of Saxony
German military personnel of the Spanish Civil War
Recipients of the Gold German Cross
Recipients of the Knight's Cross of the Iron Cross